Ngabo Médard Jobert (born August 7, 1989), known by his stage name Meddy, is a Rwandan singer and songwriter.

Biography

Early life
Meddy was born on August 7, 1989, in Bujumbura, Burundi. He is the son of Sindayihebura Alphonse (father) and Alphonsine Cyabukombe (mother) who passed away in 2022. Meddy attended Tarrant County College, Texas.

Personal life
In 2021, Meddy married his long-term Ethiopian girlfriend, Mimi Mehfira, who he had met in the U.S. They had their first child in 2022. The family live in Texas, U.S, where both parents work.

Music career
Meddy's music career started when he was a high school student, joining local singing groups in Kigali.

In a music group named 'Justified', Meddy met musical artists currently well known in Rwanda, including The Ben, Mucyo and Lick Lick.

Meddy's career came into the limelight in 2008. By the end of 2010, Meddy and The Ben were among the Rwanda's most influential pop singers. He moved to the US in 2010 for education and music purposes and joined the PressOne Entertainment music label.

Meddy had international recognition when he released the song 'Slowly' in 2017, that became a major hit in East and Central African countries. He has since worked with the likes of Otile Brown, RJ The DJ, Rayvanny, Willy Paul and The Ben and other recognized names in East African music.

Awards and nominations

References

Living people
1989 births
Rwandan male singers